The Cadet UT-1 is an American single-seat, high wing, strut-braced glider modified by Alex Dawydoff from the original Slingsby Kirby Cadet design and produced by Cadet Aeronautics.

Design and development
In 1942 Dawydoff obtained the plans and the rights to produce the Slingsby Cadet under licence from Fred Slingsby. Dawydoff had the plans redrawn to US measurements, the structural strength increased, plus a new tow hook and wing rigging design.

The UT-1 is built predominantly from wood, with the fuselage wooden framed and covered in plywood. The wing and tail are also wooden-framed and covered in doped aircraft fabric covering. The two-spar wing is supported by dual struts.

Dawydoff's plan was to gain government support to provide the UT-1 in kit form for assembly by schools and clubs. The government money was not forthcoming and the post-war period saw a large number of surplus military training gliders saturate the market. As a result, only one UT-1 was completed. It is now located in the National Soaring Museum.

Aircraft on display
National Soaring Museum - 1

Specifications (UT-1)

See also

References

1940s United States sailplanes
Aircraft first flown in 1943